Sycamore Creek is a perennial stream in Santa Clara County, California, United States.  The headwaters rise on the eastern hillsides near Twin Peaks and flow southwest, eventually joining with Uvas Creek.

History
The creek was named for the many sycamore trees growing along its bank.

The Sycamore Creek Vineyards in Uvas Valley lies near the intersection between the creeks.

See also
 Riparian zone

References

Rivers of Santa Clara County, California
Rivers of Northern California